Frischknecht is a surname. Notable people with the surname include:

Andri Frischknecht (born 1994), Swiss cross-country mountain biker
Blake Frischknecht (born 1995), American soccer player
Hans Frischknecht (1922–2003), Swiss long-distance runner
Hans Eugen Frischknecht (born 1939), Swiss composer, organist, choral conductor, and harpsichordist
Lee Frischknecht (1928–2004), American broadcast journalist
Paulo Frischknecht (born 1961), Portuguese swimmer
Thomas Frischknecht (born 1970), Swiss mountain bike and cyclo-cross racer